Andy Page is a fictional character appearing in several well-known short stories written by popular Australian writer and poet Henry Lawson. Andy is rarely found without the company of good mates Jim Bently and Dave Regan, and is generally the 'straight man' of the trio.

Andy's character first appeared in Lawson's short story, "Andy Page's Rival." This story was published in Lawson's collection On the Track in 1900. 

"The Iron-Bark Chip," which includes the characters of Andy Page, Dave Regan, and Jack Bentley (most likely the character more commonly known as Jim Bently) was published in the same collection.

Possibly the most popular Andy Page story would be Lawson's humorous "The Loaded Dog", in which Dave's imaginative idea of fishing with explosives backfires when the cartridge is left unattended.

Andy, like Dave, is extremely fond of fishing. According to "The Loaded Dog," "Andy would fish for three hours at a stretch if encouraged by a ‘nibble’ or a ‘bite’ now and then— say once in twenty minutes." Whilst Dave thought up the idea for the explosive fishing cartridge, Andy implemented it. "Andy usually put Dave’s theories into practice if they were practicable, or bore the blame for the failure and the chaffing of his mates if they weren’t."

References

Characters in short stories
Male characters in literature
Literary characters introduced in 1900